Girls Islamic Organisation or GIO  is a student organisation in India for girls. 
It came to existence under the patronage of state committees of Jamaat-e-Islami Hind as their girl's wing. 

GIO actively works in a number of Indian states including Rajasthan, West Bengal, Andhra Pradesh, Telangana, Maharashtra, Kerala, Delhi, Gujarat and Karnataka.

History 

Since 1984, GIO has functioned as a part of the Women’s Wing of the Jamaat-e-Islami in Kerala. Later, it was spread to create state committees in various states of India. 
In 2007, it started working in state of Andhrapradesh and Telangana.
It later added Goa, Delhi, Maharashtra, Gujarat, and Karnataka.

The GIO claimed that it is working in female students and young women for self empowerment, against discrimination on basis of religion, culture and caste. GIO also claims that all their activities are on to the grounds of Islam. GIO conducting camps, campaigns and contests for the their age group

GIO regularly conducts study classes, and public meetings for girls. It organizes occasional campaigns for female students and young women. GIO participating or conducting the protests in women related issues.

See also

 Students Islamic Organisation of India
 Jamaat-e-Islami Hind

References

External links
BS
The hans India
Livemint
1
2
IE
Goa
The wire
Telangana

Women's education in India
Islamic organisations based in India